Fomento de Construcciones y Contratas, S.A., or FCC, is a Spanish construction company based in Barcelona. Until November 2014, over 50 percent of the shares were owned by a company controlled by the daughter of its founder, Esther Koplowitz and others, when George Soros bought around 25 percent of her rights to acquire shares.

History
The business was founded in Barcelona in 1900 as Fomento de Obras y Construcciones S.A. and became known as FOCSA. In 1992 FOCSA merged with Construcciones y Contratas, a company founded in Madrid in 1944 to form Fomento de Construcciones y Contratas, S.A.

Proactiva was a 50–50 joint venture formed in 1999 between Veolia Environnement and FCC, until Veolia bought the other 50 percent share from FCC in 2013.

In September 2006 FCC acquired the British Waste Recycling Group, excluding its landfill gas operations, from Terra Firma Capital Partners for £1.4 billion.

In July 2013, Alpine Bau Holding GmbH, a subsidiary of FCC which had accumulated debt of €2.56 billion and placed €190 million of corporate bonds on the Wiener Börse OTC, went into administration.

In August 2013, FCC sold its subsidiary Alpine Energie, a company of 3,000 employees in the German-speaking Alps that builds and maintains power plants, telecommunications, and traffic infrastructure, to Triton Partners, a private equity company, for just under €100 million ($133 million).

In November 2014, FCC shared that American business magnate George Soros would become a key shareholder.

In March 2015, it was announced that Mexican business magnate Carlos Slim would also be a minority shareholder in the company.

Structure
 the business was divided into the following three major divisions:
 FCC Environmental services like Urban related services (Versia)
 FCC Water
 FCC Infrastructure, including subdivisions construction, cement, concessions, industrial (includes energy distribution networks, mining and biofuel, oil and gas pipelines for Repsol, CLH, Gas Natural Fenosa and Enagás.) and real estate (Realia)

Major projects

Major FCC construction projects have included:
 Torre Picasso in Madrid, completed in 1988
 Gate of Europe, completed in 1996
 Prince Philip Museum of Science in Valencia, completed in 2000 
 Torre Caja Madrid, completed in 2008
 Pasajul Basarab in Bucharest, completed in 2011
 New Europe Bridge between Bulgaria and Romania, completed in 2013
 Haren Prison, Brussels, Belgium, completed in 2022

References

External links
 

Construction and civil engineering companies of Spain
Companies based in the Community of Madrid
Companies based in Barcelona
Construction and civil engineering companies established in 1900
Spanish companies established in 1900
Companies listed on the Madrid Stock Exchange
Multinational companies headquartered in Spain
Spanish brands